Vangaon is a railway station on the Western line of the Mumbai Suburban Railway network.

Trains

The following trains halt at Vangaon railway station in both directions:

 19023/24 Mumbai Central - Firozpur Janata Express

 All passenger trains (non express) in both directions halt at vangaon station .

 Mumbai suburban local trains extended their service beyond virar station up to Dahanu road station from 16 April 2013. All local trains halt at Vangaon station.

References

Railway stations in Palghar district
Mumbai Suburban Railway stations
Mumbai WR railway division